Baker Mountain is a wild, trail-less mountain located in Beaver Cove (TA.2 R.13&14, WELS), Piscataquis County, Maine. It is flanked to the northwest by Lily Bay Mountain.

The east side of Baker Mountain drains into Baker Mountain Brook, then into the West Branch of the Pleasant River, the Piscataquis River, the Penobscot River, and into Penobscot Bay. The southwest side of Baker Mountain drains into North Brook, then into Upper and Lower Wilson Ponds, Eagle Stream, Big Wilson Stream, Sebec Lake, and the Sebec River, another tributary of the Piscataquis River. The northwest side of Baker Mountain drains into South Brook, then into Moosehead Lake, the source of the Kennebec River, which drains into the Gulf of Maine.

The southern slopes of the mountain are part of the Katahdin Iron Works conservation property.

References

See also 
 List of mountains in Maine
 New England Fifty Finest

Mountains of Piscataquis County, Maine
Appalachian Mountain Club